John Crowley (born 19 August 1969) is an Irish film and theatre director. He is best known for the films Brooklyn (2015) and his debut feature, Intermission (2003), for which he won an Irish Film and Television Award for Best Director. He is a brother of the designer Bob Crowley.

Education
Crowley earned a BA in English and Philosophy (1990) and an MA in Philosophy from University College Cork.

Career
Crowley became involved in theatre as a student, seeing it as a stepping stone to directing film. He began directing plays in Dublin in the early 1990s, reached London's West End by 1996 and eventually become an associate director at the Donmar Warehouse. In 2000, he directed Come and Go as part of the Beckett on Film series and made his feature debut Intermission (2003), a comedy drama set in Dublin, starring Colin Farrell, Cillian Murphy and Kelly Macdonald, based on a screenplay by playwright Mark O'Rowe.

In May 2005, Crowley, along with Danny Boyle, launched the UK Film Council Development Fund's "25 Words or Less: Director’s Cut" scheme to develop a feature film project, stating that he wanted particularly to "create a contemporary 'rebirth' or transformation story about a man or woman who begins as someone that spreads coldness."

In 2007, Crowley reteamed with O'Rowe for the thought-provoking BAFTA-winning drama Boy A, about a young man's return to civilian life after imprisonment for a brutal childhood killing, which was made for British television but was released theatrically in the US the following year. It won him the Best Director (Fiction) award at the 2008 British Academy Television Craft Awards.

Additionally, Crowley was Tony nominated for the hugely successful London and Broadway runs of Martin McDonagh's play The Pillowman in 2003 and 2005. He directed Neve Campbell and Cillian Murphy in the West End production of Love Song in 2006-7, and in 2007 filmed a television version of Harold Pinter's Celebration starring Michael Gambon, Stephen Rea and Colin Firth. In 2009 he directed the film Is Anybody There?, set in 1980s seaside Britain, written by Peter Harness and starring Michael Caine as a grumpy ex-magician. In 2010, Crowley teamed once again with McDonagh for A Behanding in Spokane on Broadway.

In July 2016, it was announced that Crowley will direct the screen adaptation of Donna Tartt's Pulitzer Prize-winning novel The Goldfinch for Warner Bros. and RatPac Entertainment, starring Ansel Elgort, Oakes Fegley, Aneurin Barnard and Finn Wolfhard.

Theatre
 A Very expensive Poison (2019) The Old Vic - written by Lucy Prebble. 
 The Present (2016) on Broadway – Anton Chekhov's Platonov adaptation by Andrew Upton. Starring Cate Blanchett, Richard Roxburgh, Toby Schmitz, Jacqueline McKenzie.
 The Playboy of the Western World (2011) – Old Vic Theatre. Starring Ruth Negga, Niamh Cusack and Robert Sheehan.
 A Behanding in Spokane (2010) on Broadway.
 A Steady Rain (2009) on Broadway.
 Love Song (2006–07) – Written by John Kolvenbach. New Ambassadors Theatre (West End), London. This production, which was the UK premiere, starred Neve Campbell & Cillian Murphy.
 The Pillowman (2005) – International tour.
 The Pillowman (2003–04) – Royal National Theatre.
 On An Average Day (2002) – the Comedy Theatre (West End), London. It starred Woody Harrelson & Kyle MacLachlan.
 Tales from Hollywood (2001) – Donmar Warehouse, London.
 Juno and the Paycock (2000) – Gramercy Theatre, New York.
 The Turn of the Screw (2000) – Welsh National Opera.
 Juno and the Paycock (1999) – Donmar Warehouse, London.
 Macbeth (1999) – UK tour.
 Into the Woods (1998–99) – Donmar Warehouse, London.
 How I Learned to Drive (1998) at the Donmar Warehouse, London (UK premiere).
 An Irish Trilogy, aka Shadows (1998–99) – Royal Shakespeare Company.
 The Maids (1997) – UK tour.
 Fair Ladies at a Game of Poem Cards (1996) – Royal National Theatre.
 Double Helix (1996) – Dublin Theatre Festival/ Peacock Theatre, Dublin.
 Six Characters in Search of an Author (1995) – Abbey Theatre, Dublin.
 The Crucible (1995) – Abbey Theatre, Dublin.
 True Lines (1994) – Dublin Theatre Festival/ Bush Theatre, London
 One for the Road (1994) – Gate Theatre, Dublin.
 The Master Builder (1993–94) – Royal Lyceum Theatre, Edinburgh/ Riverside Studios, London. Co-directed with Brian Cox.
 The Match Seller Girl – Theatre Project Tokyo, Japan.
 Asylum! Asylum! – Peacock Theatre, Dublin.
 John Hughdy-Tom John – Druid Theatre Company.
 Phaedra – Gate Theatre, Dublin.

Filmography

Film

Television

Awards and nominations

References

External links
 

Living people
Irish film directors
Irish theatre directors
1969 births
People from Cork (city)
Alumni of University College Cork
Irish television directors